The 1933 Tennessee Volunteers football team represented the University of Tennessee in the 1933 college football season.  Robert Neyland served his eighth year as head coach of the Volunteers.  This was the first year that the Vols played in the newly formed Southeastern Conference.

This was also Tennessee's first homecoming loss. A week earlier, the Volunteers lost to Duke in Durham, North Carolina, 10–2. It was Tennessee's first defeat since a loss on October 18, 1930, to Alabama. Between those two losses, Tennessee, compiled a record of 26–0–2.

Schedule

References

Tennessee
Tennessee Volunteers football seasons
Tennessee Volunteers football